, or SIST, is a private university in Fukuroi, Shizuoka, Japan.

The predecessor of the school was founded in 1940 as a driving school. It was chartered as a university in 1991, specializing in mechanical engineering, electrical engineering and computer technology. The university has approximately 1500 students in two faculties: the Faculty of Science and Technology and the Faculty of Comprehensive Informatics.

The university has reciprocal relationships with Daegu University in South Korea and Zhejiang Gongshang University in China.

External links
 Official website

Educational institutions established in 1940
Private universities and colleges in Japan
Universities and colleges in Shizuoka Prefecture
Engineering universities and colleges in Japan
Fukuroi, Shizuoka
1940 establishments in Japan